Marisla Seamount, also known as "El Bajo", is located about  north-northeast of La Paz, Mexico.

Marisla Seamount was named after dive-cruise ship Marisla II (Mexican Flag), formerly USCG Cutter Columbine, owned by Maria Luisa Adcock and Richard M. Adcock. Richard was the first known sport diver, using SCUBA gear, to dive on the Seamount in 1957.  Adcock began making commercial sport diving cruises to the sea mount utilizing Marisla (a converted LCM 56) and continued the dive business with Marisla II from 1968 through 2009. Marisla and Marisla II have both been scrapped.

External links
Scuba Travel
The Seamount
Baja Diving

Seamounts of the Pacific Ocean